Anthony Dymoke Powell  (21 December 1905 – 28 March 2000) was an English novelist best known for his 12-volume work A Dance to the Music of Time, published between 1951 and 1975. It is on the list of longest novels in English.

Powell's major work has remained in print continuously and has been the subject of television and radio dramatisations. In 2008, The Times newspaper named Powell among their list of "the 50 greatest British writers since 1945".

Life

Powell was born in Westminster, Middlesex, the son of Lieutenant-Colonel Philip Lionel William Powell (1882-1959), of the Welch Regiment, and Maud Mary (died 1954), daughter of Edmund Lionel Wells-Dymoke, of The Grange, East Molesey, Surrey, descendant of a land-owning family in Lincolnshire, hereditary Champions to monarchs since King Richard II, having married into the family of the Barons Marmion, who first held the position. The Powell family descended from ancient Welsh kings and chieftains. Anthony Powell had a strong interest in genealogy; he conducted extensive research into the Powell family over many years, establishing a paternal descent from Gwriad ap Elidyr — himself a descendant of Coel Hen according to the Genealogies from Jesus College MS 20 and other sources —  via Rhys ap Gruffydd to the satisfaction of the heralds of the College of Arms, who in 1964 granted him use of the ancient Powell arms. This pedigree was included in Burke's Landed Gentry.

Because of his father's career and the First World War, the family moved several times, and mother and son sometimes lived apart from Powell's father. Powell attended Gibbs's pre-preparatory day-school for a brief time. He was then sent to New Beacon School near Sevenoaks, which was popular with military families. Early in 1919, Powell passed the Common Entrance Examination for Eton, where he started that autumn. There, he befriended fellow pupil Henry Yorke, later to become known as novelist Henry Green. At Eton, Powell spent much of his spare time at the Studio, where a sympathetic art master encouraged him to develop his talent as a draughtsman and his interest in the visual arts. In 1922, he became a founding member of the Eton Society of Arts. The society's members produced an occasional magazine called The Eton Candle.

In the autumn of 1923, Powell went up to Balliol College, Oxford. Soon after his arrival, he was introduced to the Hypocrites' Club. Outside that club, he came to know Maurice Bowra, then a young don at Wadham College. During his third year, Powell lived out of college, sharing rooms with Henry Yorke.  Powell travelled on the Continent during his holidays. He was awarded a third-class degree at the end of his academic years.

Upon his arrival in London after Oxford, part of Powell's social life centered around attendance at formal debutante dances at houses in Mayfair and Belgravia. He renewed acquaintance with Evelyn Waugh, whom he had known at Oxford, and was a frequent guest for Sunday supper at Waugh's parents' house. Waugh introduced him to the Gargoyle Club, which gave him experience in London's Bohemia. He got to know painters Nina Hamnett and Adrian Daintrey, who were neighbours in Fitzrovia, and composer Constant Lambert, who remained a good friend until Lambert's death in 1951.

In 1934, he married Lady Violet Pakenham. In 1952, they moved to The Chantry, a country home in Whatley, west of Frome, Somerset.

Powell joined the Welch Regiment in 1939 and was stationed in Northern Ireland at the time of air raids in Belfast. He was later a Military Intelligence Liaison overseeing relations with, and the basic material needs of, foreign troops in exile. For his service in the Army, he received two General Service medals as well as the 1944 France and Germany Star for escorting a group of Allied military attaches from Normandy to Montgomery’s 21st Army Group Tactical HQ in November 1944 three miles from Roermond, Holland then held by the Germans. For representing the interests of foreign armies in exile as a liaison officer he received the following decorations the Order of the White Lion (Czechoslovakia), Oaken Crown (Luxembourg), Order of Leopold II (Belgium),and Luxembourg War Cross (Croix de Guerre
-Luxembourg). 

Powell was appointed a Commander of the Order of the British Empire (CBE) in 1956, and in 1973, he declined an offer of knighthood. He was appointed Companion of Honour (CH) in 1988. He served as a trustee of the National Portrait Gallery from 1962 to 1976. With Lady Violet, he travelled to the United States, India, Guatemala, Italy, and Greece.

Powell's health declined in his later years after multiple strokes. On 28 March 2000, he died at The Chantry at the age of 94.

Work

Powell came to work in London during the autumn of 1926 and lived at various London addresses for the next 25 years. He worked in a form of apprenticeship at the publishers Gerald Duckworth and Company in Covent Garden, leaving their employ in 1932 after protracted negotiations about title, salary, and working hours. He next took a job as a script writer at the Warner Bros. studio in Teddington, where he remained for six months. He made an abortive attempt to find employment in Hollywood as a screenwriter in 1937. He next found work reviewing novels for The Daily Telegraph and memoirs and autobiographies for The Spectator.

Upon the outbreak of the Second World War, Powell, at age 34, joined the British Army as a second lieutenant, making him more than 10 years older than most of his fellow subalterns, not at all well prepared for military life, and lacking in experience. His superiors found uses for his talents, resulting in a series of transfers that brought him special training courses designed to produce a nucleus of officers to deal with the problems of military government after the Allies had defeated the Axis powers. He eventually secured an assignment with the Intelligence Corps and additional training. His military career continued with a posting to the War Office in Whitehall, where he was attached to the section known as Military Intelligence (Liaison), and later for a short time to the Cabinet Office, to serve on the Secretariat of the Joint Intelligence Committee, securing promotions along the way.

Returning to Military Intelligence (Liaison), in the War Office, he had responsibility for dealings with the Czechs, later with the Belgians and Luxembourgers, and later still the French. In November 1944, Powell acted as assistant escorting officer to a group of 14 Allied military attachés taken to France and Belgium to see something of the campaign.

After his demobilisation at the end of the war, writing became his sole career.

Despite a holiday trip to the Soviet Union in 1936, he remained unsympathetic to the popular-front, leftist politics of many of his literary and critical contemporaries. A confirmed Tory, Powell maintained a certain skepticism, often associating with George Orwell and Malcolm Muggeridge. He was wary of right-wing groups and suspicious of inflated rhetoric.

Family

Powell married Lady Violet Pakenham (1912–2002), sister of Lord Longford, on 1 December 1934 at All Saints, Ennismore Gardens, Knightsbridge. Powell and his wife relocated to 1 Chester Gate in Regent's Park, London, where they remained for 17 years. Their first son, Tristram, was born in April 1940, but Powell and his wife spent most of the war years apart, while he served in the Welch Regiment and later in the Intelligence Corps. A second son, John, was born in January 1946.

On 30 April 2018, Powell's granddaughter Georgia Powell married Henry Somerset, 12th Duke of Beaufort.

Writing

Powell's first novel, Afternoon Men, was published by Duckworth in 1931, with Powell supervising its production himself.  The same firm published his next three novels, two of them after Powell had left the firm. During his time in California, Powell contributed several articles to the magazine Night and Day, edited by Graham Greene. Powell wrote a few more occasional pieces for the magazine until it ceased publication in March 1938. Powell completed his fifth novel, What's Become of Waring, in late 1938 or early 1939. After being turned down by Duckworth, it was published by Cassell in March of that year. The book sold fewer than a thousand copies.

Anticipating the difficulties of creative writing during wartime, Powell began to assemble material for a biography of 17th-century writer John Aubrey. His army career, though, forced him to postpone even that biographical work. When the war ended, Powell resumed work on Aubrey, completing the manuscript of John Aubrey and His Friends in May 1946, though it only appeared in 1948 after difficult negotiations and arguments with publishers. He then edited a selection of Aubrey's writings that appeared the following year.

Powell returned to novel writing, and began to ponder a long novel sequence. Over the next 30 years, he produced his major work: A Dance to the Music of Time. Its 12 novels have been acclaimed by such critics as A. N. Wilson and fellow writers including Evelyn Waugh and Kingsley Amis as among the finest English fiction of the 20th century. Auberon Waugh dissented, calling it "tedious and overpraised—particularly by literary hangers-on". Long-time friend V. S. Naipaul cast similar doubts regarding the work, if not the Powell oeuvre. Naipaul described his sentiments after a long-delayed review of Powell's work following the author's death this way: "it may be that our friendship lasted all this time because I had not examined his work". While often compared to Proust, others find the comparison "obvious, although superficial." Its narrator's voice is more like the participant-observer of The Great Gatsby than that of Proust's self-regarding narrator. Powell was awarded the 1957 James Tait Black Memorial Prize for the fourth volume, At Lady Molly's. The eleventh volume, Temporary Kings, received the W. H. Smith Prize in 1974. The cycle of novels, narrated by a protagonist with experiences and perspectives similar to Powell's own, follows the trajectory of the author's own life, offering a vivid portrayal of the intersection of bohemian life with high society between 1921 and 1971.

The title of the multivolume series is taken from the painting of the same name by Poussin, which hangs in the Wallace Collection. Its characters, many modelled loosely on real people, surface, vanish, and reappear throughout the sequence. It is not, however, a roman à clef. The characters are drawn from the upper classes, their marriages and affairs, and their bohemian acquaintances.

In parallel with his creative writing, Powell served as the primary fiction reviewer for the Times Literary Supplement. He served as literary editor of Punch from 1953 to 1959. From 1958 to 1990, he was a regular reviewer for The Daily Telegraph, resigning after a vitriolic personal attack on him by Auberon Waugh appeared in that newspaper. He also reviewed occasionally for The Spectator.

He published two more novels, O, How the Wheel Becomes It! (1983) and The Fisher King (1986). He reprinted many of his book reviews in two volumes of critical essays, Miscellaneous Verdicts (1990) and Under Review (1992). Several volumes of Journals, covering 1982 to 1992, appeared between 1995 and 1997. His Writer's Notebook was published posthumously in 2001, and a third volume of critical essays, Some Poets, Artists, and a Reference for Mellors, appeared in 2005.  Between 1976 and 1982, he published four volumes of memoirs with the overall title of To Keep the Ball Rolling.

Alan Furst, an author of spy novels, has noted of him, "Powell does everything a novelist can do, from flights of aesthetic passion to romance to comedy high and low. His dialogue is extraordinary; often terse, pedestrian and perfect, each character using three or four words. Anthony Powell taught me to write; he has such brilliant control of the mechanics of the novel."

Powell has been called the "English Proust", but two essays by Perry Anderson demonstrate significant differences between the two writers. The comparative analysis, A Dance to Lost Time: Marcel Proust's 'In Search of Lost Time' compared with Anthony Powell's 'A Dance to the Music of Time'''  by Patrick Alexander explores the reception of the two.

RecognitionDance was adapted by Hugh Whitemore for a television miniseries during the autumn of 1997, and broadcast in the UK on Channel 4. The novel sequence was earlier adapted by Graham Gauld and Frederick Bradnum for a BBC Radio 4 26-part series broadcast between 1978 and 1981. In the radio version, the part of Jenkins as narrator was played by Noel Johnson. A second radio dramatisation by Michael Butt was broadcast during April and May 2008.

A centenary exhibition in commemoration of Powell's life and work was held at the Wallace Collection, London, from November 2005 to February 2006. Smaller exhibitions were held in 2005 and 2006 at Eton College, Cambridge University, the Grolier Club in New York City, and Georgetown University in Washington, DC.

In 1995, he was awarded an honorary degree (Doctor of Letters) from the University of Bath. Hilary Spurling, a newspaper colleague, had written at Powell's request in 1977 Invitation to the Dance: A Guide to Anthony Powell's Dance to the Music of Time, and in 2017 published his biography, Anthony Powell: Dancing to the Music of Time.

Bibliography
A Dance to the Music of TimeA Question of Upbringing (1951)A Buyer's Market (1952)The Acceptance World (1955)At Lady Molly's (1957)Casanova's Chinese Restaurant (1960)The Kindly Ones (1962)The Valley of Bones (1964)The Soldier's Art (1966)The Military Philosophers (1968)Books Do Furnish a Room (1971)Temporary Kings (1973)Hearing Secret Harmonies (1975)
Standalone novelsAfternoon Men (1931)Venusberg (1932)From a View to a Death (1933)Agents and Patients (1936)What's Become of Waring (1939)
Baptism (1962)
O How the Wheel Become it! (1983)
The Fisher King (1986)

Partial bibliography of other plays, and worksThe Barnard Letters (1928)
"The Watr'y Glade", in The Old School: Essays by Divers Hands, ed. Graham Greene (1934)Novels of High Society from the Victorian Age. Ed. and introduced by Anthony Powell. Pilot Press, 1947John Aubrey and His Friends (1948)
 Brief Lives and Other Selected Writings of John Aubrey. Ed. Anthony Powell. Cresset Press, 1949Two Plays: The Garden God, The Rest I'll Whistle (1971)
 A Writer’s Notebook, 2001
 Miscellaneous Verdicts. Writings on Writers 1946-1989, 1990
 Under Review. Further Writings on Writers 1946-1989, 1991
 Some Poets, Artists & 'A Reference for Mellors, 2005
 The Acceptance of Absurdity. Anthony Powell & Robert Vanderbilt: Letters 1952 - 1963. Eds. John Saumarez Smith & Jonathan Kooperstein. Maggs Bros, 2011
 Anthony Powell on Wine. Edited by Robin Bynoe. Anthony Powell Society, 2017
 King Arthur and Other Personages. Edited by Robin Bynoe. Anthony Powell Society, 2019MemoirsTo Keep the Ball Rolling: Memoirs of Anthony Powell
vol. 1, Infants of the Spring (1976)
vol. 2, Messengers of Day (1978)
vol. 3, Faces in My Time (1980)
vol. 4, The Strangers All are Gone (1982)

A one-volume abridgment, called simply To Keep the Ball Rolling, was published in 1983.DiariesJournals 1982–1986 (1995)
Journals 1987–1989 (1996)
Journals 1990–1992 (1997)

References

Further reading
 Barber, Michael. Anthony Powell: A Life, Duckworth Overlook, 2004. 
 Birns, Nicholas. Understanding Anthony Powell, University of South Carolina Press, 2004.  
Fallowell, Duncan, 20th Century Characters, ch. Classical with Grottoes: Anthony Powell and Lady Violet near Frome, (London, Vintage Books, 1994)
 Hitchens, Christopher: Anthony Powell: An Omnivorous Curiosity (Review of To Keep the Ball Rolling, in: Arguably. Essays by Christopher Hitchens, pp. 276 – 289, New York 2011 [first published in The Atlantic, June 2001]. 
 Joyau, Isabelle: Investigating Powell's A Dance to the Music of Time, London 1994. 
 Kislinger, Peter: Review Article: Isabelle Joyau, Investigating Powell’s 'A Dance to the Music of Time''', London 1994, in: Anthony Powell Society Newsletter 3/Spring 2001 [originally published in German in: Sprachkunst, Österreichische Akademie der Wissenschaften, 1996/2]
 Roger K. Miller, "Author offers intelligent study of 'English Proust'", The Pittsburgh Tribune-Review, 5 September 2004The Album of Anthony Powell's 'Dance to the Music of Time [Hardcover, with 224 illustrations], Anthony Powell (Preface), edited by Violet Powell, Introduction by John Bayley, London 1987.
 Selig, Robert: Time and Anthony Powell. A Critical Study, Cranbury 1991. 
 Norman Shrapnel, "Anthony Powell", The Guardian, 30 March 2000
 Spurling, Hilary. Invitation to the Dance: A Guide to Anthony Powell's Dance to the Music of Time, Little Brown, 1977. 
 Spurling, Hilary. Anthony Powell: Dancing to the Music of Time, Hamish Hamilton, 2017. 
 Tucker, James. The Novels of Anthony Powell, Columbia University Press, 1976. 
 Powell author page and archive at The London Review of Books

External links

 Anthony Powell Society
 
 
 

1905 births
2000 deaths
20th-century English novelists
20th-century diarists
Alumni of Balliol College, Oxford
British Army personnel of World War II
Commanders of the Order of the British Empire
English diarists
English memoirists
Intelligence Corps officers
James Tait Black Memorial Prize recipients
Members of the Order of the Companions of Honour
Modernist writers
People educated at Eton College
People educated at Gibbs School
People from Mendip District
People from Westminster
Royal Artillery officers
The Daily Telegraph people
Welch Regiment officers